CSPT may refer to:
 Canadian Society of Pharmacology and Therapeutics;
 The Czech-Slovak Poker Tour.